The 1942 Wyoming gubernatorial election took place on November 3, 1942. Incumbent Republican Governor Nels H. Smith ran for a second term as governor. After defeating several opponents in the Republican primary, he advanced to the general election, where he was opposed by Lester C. Hunt, the Wyoming Secretary of State and the Democratic nominee. In a reversal from Smith's landslide election in 1938, Hunt narrowly defeated him in his attempt at a second term.

Democratic primary

Candidates
Lester C. Hunt, Secretary of State of Wyoming
Gus Engelking, rancher, 1938 Democratic candidate for Governor

Republican primary

Candidates
Nels H. Smith, incumbent Governor
Frank Cowan, former Mayor of Casper
John F. Raper, Sheridan attorney, 1938 Republican candidate for Governor

Results

References

Wyoming
1942
1942 Wyoming elections
November 1942 events